Winner Takes All is a game show that aired on ITV from 20 April 1975 to 28 June 1988, first hosted by Jimmy Tarbuck from 1975 to 1986 and then hosted by Geoffrey Wheeler from 1987 to 1988. The show then returned on the screens in 1997, this time on Challenge TV hosted by Bobby Davro.

Gameplay
The two contestants started with 50 points each (30 points when it became a daytime show in 1988) and were asked multiple choice questions with six possible answers but each answer had some odds (Evens (removed by 1986), 2–1, 3–1, 4–1, 5–1 & 10–1) and after each question was asked, the contestants were asked how many points they would like to bet (up to 50 (30 in 1988)) and then, they selected the odds that corresponded to the answer they thought was correct, if they got the correct answer, they won the points the odds were worth, if they gave a wrong answer, they lost the points. After five questions, the contestant with the most points would go through to the final while the loser left the show with nothing. In later series, the losers took home a filofax (except the 1988 series where they took home an encyclopedia). In the Challenge TV version, the losers took home a Winner Takes All T-shirt. Then, they played again with two different contestants and the winner of that met the winner of the first game.

The two winners played for cash in the final with a maximum of £1,000 to be won. Only the winner took the money home while the loser took home a consolation prize of £100: the winning contestant was given the option of returning on the next show to add to his or her winnings, but if they returned and lost they would lose all but £100 of their winnings. By 1979, a defeated champion lost half the winnings.

Production
From 1980 until 1987, Winner Takes All started with an alternative version of the Yorkshire Television ident where the chevron would spin toward the screen revealing the four contestants who appeared on that week's edition. The final ITV series in 1988 was a Television Techniques production for Yorkshire Television.

The Challenge version was recorded at the former TVS studios at Vinters Park in Maidstone, but was produced by Yorkshire Television.

During his run as host, Jimmy Tarbuck would at the start of some editions come out carrying a briefcase containing £1,000 in £1 notes which was the top prize on Winner Takes All.

In 1989, Iorworth Hoare was jailed for rape after being identified from a photo he submitted to the show when applying to be a contestant.

Transmissions

ITV era

Series

 Series 1: The series was not fully networked, with Granada, HTV and LWT not broadcasting the series. LWT started broadcasting the series on 22 August 1975.
 Series 14: Grampian and Scottish started on 20 April, but Scottish Television finished on 7 July 1988, while Grampian completed the series on 15 July 1988; a number of episodes were held back.

Specials

Challenge TV era

References

External links
.

1975 British television series debuts
1997 British television series endings
1970s British game shows
1980s British game shows
1990s British game shows
ITV game shows
Television series by ITV Studios
Television series by Yorkshire Television
English-language television shows
British television series revived after cancellation